Ryoko Takemura (born 2 June 1976) is a Japanese former professional tennis player. She competed predominantly on the ITF Women's Circuit, winning three singles and nine doubles titles.

In 1999 she won a Universiade bronze medal for Japan in the women's doubles with Seiko Okamoto.

At the 2004 Australian Open, Takemura and Seiko Okamoto were given a wildcard into the doubles main draw, where they were beaten in the opening round by second seeds Martina Navratilova and Lisa Raymond.

In 2005, she teamed up with Tomoko Yonemura to win three $25k tournaments, and reached her best doubles ranking of 165 in the world.

ITF finals

Singles: 6 (3–3)

Doubles: 19 (9–10)

References

External links
 
 

1976 births
Living people
Japanese female tennis players
Universiade medalists in tennis
Universiade bronze medalists for Japan
Medalists at the 1999 Summer Universiade
20th-century Japanese women
21st-century Japanese women